The Royal National Institute of Blind People (RNIB) is a UK charity offering information, support and advice to almost two million people in the UK with sight loss.

History 
The RNIB was founded by Thomas Rhodes Armitage, a doctor who had eyesight problems.

In 1868, Armitage founded an organisation known as the British and Foreign Society for Improving Embossed Literature for the Blind. This later became the British and Foreign Blind Association. In 1875 Queen Victoria became the organisation's first patron.

The organisation received a Royal Charter in 1948, and changed its name to Royal National Institute for the Blind in 1953. In 2002, RNIB membership was introduced and the organisation's name changed to Royal National Institute of the Blind. In June 2007 the organisation changed its name again, to Royal National Institute of Blind People.

RNIB owned hotels in the UK adapted for visitors with visual impairment including The Century Hotel in Blackpool but these were closed or sold due to excessive running costs. Also owned was America Lodge in Torquay, Devon which was a rehabilitation centre.  America Lodge is now privately owned and has been converted into apartments.

Organisation 
RNIB is a national organization with branches and services throughout the United Kingdom including Northern Ireland. The charity's headquarters are in London, England. RNIB's patron is Queen Elizabeth II.

In October 2008, RNIB and Action for Blind People agreed in principle to combine some services across England. The new arrangement began in April 2009, resulting in Action for Blind People becoming an Associate Charity of RNIB.

RNIB's work is supported by more than 3000 volunteers throughout the UK.

Programs 
RNIB participates in the UK Vision Strategy, an initiative of a large eye health and sight loss alliance to promote the eye health of the nation.

Education and residential care
RNIB owns several educational establishments and residential care homes:

RNIB Sunshine House School and Children's Home
Sunshine House is a specialist primary school, children's home and service for families in Northwood, Middlesex. The school educates blind and partially sighted children with significant learning difficulties and disabilities between the ages of 2 and 11 years. The residential accommodation is open to children aged between 2 and 14 years who are blind or partially sighted with significant learning difficulties and disabilities, whether they also attend the school. Children stay at Sunshine House overnight up to four nights per week, up to 50 weeks per year.

RNIB Pears Centre for Specialist Learning

RNIB Pears Centre for Specialist Learning (Formerly RNIB Rushton School and Children's Home) was a school and children's home for young people with vision impairment and multiple disabilities or complex needs. It was based near Coventry, Warwickshire. It provided specialist education and individually tailored care and therapies for children and young people between the ages of 4 and 19. The centre was closed on 7 November 2018.

RNIB Community Living Service
RNIB's Community Living Service provides support, work experience, rehabilitation services and 52-week residential care and supported living for young adults with sight loss, multiple disabilities and complex needs, from the age of 18 up to 40 years. The centre is based in Redhill, Surrey, and consists of 13 self-contained flats and several shared houses.

RNIB College Loughborough
RNIB College Loughborough is based in Loughborough, Leicestershire, and supports students with sight loss and other disabilities. The college provides further education programmes to learners aged 16–25 and adult employment programmes for adult learners aged 18–63 who are unemployed and looking to develop their skills or retrain and gain employment. The college offers residential or day programmes.

Residential care for older people
RNIB owns two residential homes for older people who are blind, partially sighted or deafblind and require permanent or short-term accommodation. RNIB's homes are based in Somerset (RNIB Kathleen Chambers House) and East Sussex (RNIB Wavertree House). The homes contain special adaptations and equipment for blind or partially sighted people including talking notice boards, talking lifts, braille embossers, magnifiers and libraries of large print, braille and audiobooks.

In November 2019, RNIB announced that it would transfer its existing facilities to new providers over the following 12 months.

Accessible products 
RNIB runs an Online shop and several Resource Centres, which sell accessible products, gifts and publications. RNIB sources, designs and supplies products to help blind and partially sighted people live independently, and to make everyday tasks easier. Products include talking clocks and watches, large button telephones, mobility aids, cookery aids and tactile toys and games.

Books 
The RNIB National Library Service contains more than 40,000 titles, making it the largest specialist library in the UK for readers with sight loss. It stocks books in accessible formats, such as braille and giant print. It also stocks braille music. The RNIB National Library Service was created in 2007 when the RNIB's library services merged with the National Library for the Blind.

Audio books are provided through the Talking Book service. RNIB's Talking Books are recorded in DAISY format. Unlike regular CDs, DAISY's digital format allows listeners to use the CD in the same way as a print book, by creating bookmarks, speeding up and slowing down playback and jumping easily around the content.

RNIB's online shop supplies accessible books, music and maps.

Good design 
RNIB promotes good design to make websites, information, products, services and buildings accessible to people with sight problems. RNIB's "See it right" guidelines give practical advice on how to design and produce accessible information.

Transcription Centres convert print and other material into accessible formats, such as braille, audio and large print. They also handle requests for transcription of mathematical documents, music and tactile maps and diagrams.

RNIB runs a number of training and consultancy services to help businesses and individuals create accessible services and products.

Campaigns 
In line with RNIB's 2009–14 strategy, RNIB campaigns and lobbies on three main priorities, as well as on reactive issues. The three main campaign priorities are:
 preventing avoidable sight loss
 supporting independent living
 creating an inclusive society.

RNIB have been involved in several successful campaigns including ensuring that disabled people receive accessible travel information on buses and coaches across Europe and lobbying the UK government to review Personal Independence Payment assessment criteria. They have campaigned for banks in the UK to make their cash machines accessible to blind and partially sighted people.

RNIB's Save Our Sight (SOS) campaign promotes measures to prevent vision loss. They work with local councils to improve eye health in the community and encourage regular eye checks and early sight-saving treatment.

Fundraising 
For every pound donated, RNIB spends 87p directly on helping blind and partially sighted people, 11p on raising more funds, and 2p on administration. RNIB organises fundraising events in the UK and overseas, as well as raffles, recycling schemes, legacy donations, online fundraising and corporate partnerships.

Sooty boxes 
Since the 1950s, the well-known children's fictional puppet character Sooty is an exclusive feature to the charity's collection boxes. Since RNIB have started collecting donation funds with Sooty Boxes, the charity so far have raised over £11.5m in total.

Magazines 
RNIB produce a number of magazines for professionals, carers and blind and partially sighted people.

Insight magazine 
Insight magazine is aimed at parents and professionals who support blind and partially sighted children and young people, including those with complex needs. The magazine covers a number of areas including information about learning and development, news and personal stories. Insight was first published by RNIB in January 2006; prior to this RNIB produced VisAbility and Eye Contact.

NB magazine 
NB (New Beacon) magazine is aimed at health and social care professionals who work with blind and partially sighted people. NB supports RNIB's focus on prevention, independent living and inclusion. The magazine covers a number of areas including eye health, rehabilitation and case studies. NB was first published by in 1917 as The Beacon; the magazine changed its name in 1930 to New Beacon and became known as NB in 2006. NB celebrated its 1,000th issue in 2001.

Vision 
Vision magazine is a bi-monthly publication produced exclusively for RNIB members. The magazine covers a range of topics including news, recipes, reviews and people profiles. Vision was first published in spring 2002, and is distributed to all of RNIB's 10,500 member in a number of formats. In 2009 Vision won a MemCom award for best magazine in the charity/other membership category.

See also 
Royal London Society for the Blind
Royal National College for the Blind
West German Audio Book Library for the Blind

References

External links 
 RNIB website
 Insight Radio - The Radio Station of RNIB
 Directory of services and organisations that help blind and partially sighted people in the UK.

Blindness organisations in the United Kingdom
Blindness charities
Charities based in London
Charities for disabled people based in the United Kingdom
Disability rights organizations
Health in the London Borough of Camden
Libraries for the blind
Organisations based in the London Borough of Camden
1868 establishments in the United Kingdom